Mike Singleton (21 February 1951 – 10 October 2012) was a British video game designer who wrote various well-regarded titles for the ZX Spectrum during the 1980s.  His titles include The Lords of Midnight, Doomdark's Revenge, Dark Sceptre, War in Middle Earth and Midwinter.  Before developing video games, Singleton was an English teacher in Ellesmere Port, Cheshire, England.

Early work
Singleton was originally a teacher and started programming in the late 1970s, and writing Computer Race, a horse racing game he designed for a betting shop on the Commodore PET.  Moving on from this, he began working on arcade games for the Pet, working with PetSoft, where he wrote Space Ace entirely in 6502 machine code.  The game broke sales records of the day by selling three hundred copies.

Singleton's association with PetSoft turned out to be short-lived, as PetSoft, who had been due to enter into a contract with Sinclair Research in Cambridge to write software for the new ZX80, lost out on the deal to Psion.  Singleton contacted British inventor and entrepreneur Clive Sinclair and was asked to send his games along.  He was then asked to visit the site in Cambridge, and invited to work on software for their brand new ZX81 micro.

Singleton used this as the platform for his GamesPack1 project. GamesPack1 was a series of games, each fitting into just 1 kilobyte of memory.  It was one of the first commercial software programs written for the ZX81, and something of a runaway success, selling a massive 90,000 copies, earning Singleton £6,000 for his efforts, having taken him just two weeks over the Christmas holidays to complete.

Golden age of the home microcomputer
Whilst the arcade game writing business was making him a living, Singleton, who retired from teaching completely in 1982 to become a full-time freelance games designer, was always an old school war gamer at heart, hooked from an early age on war board games and play-by-mail (PBM) strategy gaming, working for a time on Seventh Empire, a PBM game he put together for Computer and Video Games magazine (C&VG), which eventually led to Beyond Software when C&VG editor Terry Pratt moved to run Beyond.

In March 1984, Singleton's spy-themed board game, Treachery, which had its complicated game logic controlled by a computer program, was featured in C&VG, with a type-in listing for the Spectrum, together with a keyboard overlay (a common feature of his games), centre-spread board and a set of counters.  The game was so popular among the readers that the editor asked for conversions for the Commodore 64 and BBC Micro to be produced, and each of them featured in C&VG'''s 1985 yearbook.

Having progressed to the ZX Spectrum, he wrote what are widely regarded as some of the best strategy adventure games ever to be seen on those early home microcomputers, the Midnight series: Lords of Midnight (released in July 1984) and Doomdark's Revenge, which were originally intended to form the first two episodes in a trilogy of which, the final episode, Eye of the Moon, never came about. Each of the two games played out on a scale never seen before back in the mid-eighties, at a time when many games were boasting 50 or even 100 locations, Lords of Midnight's groundbreaking gameplay featured over 4,000 locations, and Doomdark's Revenge, 6,000, plus well in excess of 100 player controllable characters.  Had Eye of the Moon come to fruition, it was to have had around 24,000 locations, in a map featuring twelve distinct regions, each with a local sub-quest completely separate from the main objective of the game.

Moving on from the Midnight series, Singleton worked on several games of a more arcade-like nature, the first of which, Throne of Fire, a side viewed live action game, featured a multiplayer option where each player used the same computer to explore simultaneously, each trying to complete a set of objectives which lead to the overall completion of the game. Dark Sceptre, released later the same year, was also in essence a sideways viewed live action game, but returned to a more adventure-like feel, with a long, drawn out challenge awaiting the player who would need to build up their forces to consolidate their position before seizing on the opportunity to actually complete the game.

Two years later, War in Middle-earth, whilst essentially an adventure game on a similar scale to the Midnight series, represented a switch from the adventure to an action philosophy, requiring the player to interact with the characters under their control directly, moving them individually in each of the battles, giving the game much more of an arcade/adventure feel. The game was developed by Maelstrom Games, which had originally been created by Singleton to run the PBM version of Dark Sceptre.

Later work
In the late 1980s, Singleton moved onto the 16-bit machines that were making an appearance, and worked on the classic Midwinter trilogy, also producing another work in the Lords of Midnight series in 1995, Lords of Midnight: The Citadel.

In the 21st century, Singleton continued working in games design, making him one of a few developers to have made the transition to more modern consoles from the early days of home computing. Singleton worked for Midas Interactive and LucasArts on several games for the Xbox and PlayStation consoles, such as the action games HyperSonic Xtreme and Indiana Jones and the Emperor's Tomb. Singleton worked on the strategy game Wrath Unleashed, with his latest productions being Gauntlet: Seven Sorrows, a continuation of the 1980s arcade classic Gauntlet series of games, and Race Driver: Grid, a racing game developed by Codemasters. At the time of his death after suffering from cancer, Singleton was working on an iPhone port of Lords of Midnight''.

Games

8-bit home computers

Later computers

Consoles

References

External links
 Icemark.com Wiki page on Singleton
 Midnight/MU – A browser-based multiplayer game based on The Lords of Midnight/Doomdarks Revenge

1951 births
2012 deaths
Schoolteachers from Cheshire
British video game designers
Deaths from cancer in Switzerland
MicroProse people
People from Ellesmere Port
Video game producers
Video game programmers